Spring Symphony is a 1983 West German historical drama film directed by Peter Schamoni and starring Nastassja Kinski, Herbert Grönemeyer, and Rolf Hoppe. It portrays the life of the pianist Clara Wieck and her relationship with the composer Robert Schumann.

The film's sets were designed by the art director Alfred Hirschmeier. It was shot at the Tempelhof Studios in Berlin and on location in various places in Saxony including Dresden, Leipzig and Zwickau.

Cast

References

Bibliography

External links 
 

1983 films
1980s biographical drama films
1980s historical romance films
German biographical drama films
German historical romance films
West German films
1980s German-language films
Films set in the 1830s
Films set in 1840
Films set in Dresden
Films set in Leipzig
Films directed by Peter Schamoni
Films shot at Tempelhof Studios
Films about classical music and musicians
Films about composers
Films about pianos and pianists
Biographical films about musicians
Robert Schumann
Cultural depictions of classical musicians
Cultural depictions of Niccolò Paganini
1983 drama films
1980s German films